Francisco García es un delantero de el fútbol joven de Colo Colo que debuto profesionalmente ante Audax italiano.

Club career
García started his career with Atlético Marte of the Salvadoran Primera División. He participated in league fixtures for the club from 2010, making one hundred and ten appearances from the 2011–12 season up until 2015–16 - whilst also netting two goals, against FAS in 2013 and Águila in 2014 respectively. Atlético Marte were relegated to Segunda División de El Salvador at the conclusion of 2015–16, though García was released halfway through in January 2016 following disciplinary issues. He subsequently joined Sonsonate, though was unable to feature due to contractual disagreements between the two clubs.

In 2019, García headed to the United States with National Premier Soccer League side El Farolito. He appeared nine times in the Golden Gate Conference, whilst also appearing in the U.S. Open Cup in games against Academica SC and Fresno FC.

International career
García represented El Salvador at U23 and senior level. He won one cap for the former, it arrived in a 2012 CONCACAF Men's Pre-Olympic Tournament qualifier against Panama. In October 2014, García was called up to Albert Roca's first-team squad for friendlies with Colombia and Ecuador in the United States. He was substituted on in place of Alexander Mendoza during the match with Colombia at Red Bull Arena. He won his second cap a month later versus Panama at the Estadio Cuscatlán.

Career statistics

Club
.

International

References

External links

1990 births
Living people
Sportspeople from San Salvador
Salvadoran footballers
El Salvador international footballers
Association football defenders
Salvadoran expatriate footballers
Expatriate soccer players in the United States
Salvadoran expatriate sportspeople in the United States
Primera División de Fútbol Profesional players
National Premier Soccer League players
C.D. Atlético Marte footballers
C.D. Sonsonate footballers
El Farolito Soccer Club players